Acanaloniidae is a family of planthoppers. It is sometimes treated as a subfamily of Issidae (as Acanaloniinae).

Genera
Genera include:
Acanalonia Spinola, 1839
Aylaella Demir & Özdikmen, 2009
Batusa Melichar, 1901
Bulldolonia Gnezdilov, 2012
Chlorochara Stål, 1869
Notosimus Fennah, 1965
Philatis Stål, 1862

References

 
Auchenorrhyncha families
Fulgoromorpha